A gravity gun is a type of device in video games, particularly first-person shooters using physics engines, whereby players can directly manipulate objects in the world, often allowing them to be used as projectiles against hostile characters. The concept was popularized by the gravity gun found in Valve's Half-Life 2, as well as the Temporal Uplink found in Free Radical Design's TimeSplitters: Future Perfect; although a similar concept was used by id Software during the production of the earlier game Doom 3, eventually leading to the introduction of a physics-based weapon in the expansion pack Resurrection of Evil. Later games, such as Portal, BioShock, Crysis, Dead Space, and Garry's Mod have been influenced by the success of these physics-based weapons, adopting their own styles of comparable abilities or weapons.

Half-Life 2

Valve's Half-Life 2 made significant use of physics, powered by the Source engine. The physics engine within Source is derived from Havok, which opens up a wealth of possibilities for object interaction – particularly when later in the game, Freeman receives an energy-beam weapon that lets him move huge objects. Although the player can pick up and throw objects early in the game, this ability is somewhat limited in scope. Around a quarter of the way through the game, the player acquires the gravity gun, properly named as the "Zero-point Energy Field Manipulator". Alyx Vance explains that the gravity gun is designed for handling hazardous materials, but is mostly used for heavy lifting. She explains to Gordon that she once found it useful "for clearing minefields". The gravity gun significantly increases the player's ability to manipulate objects in the game. Like most other weapons in the game, the gravity gun has two trigger functions. The primary trigger causes the gun to emit a small discharge which emits energy to the targeted object. The distance which the object is forced is dependent on its weight and distance from the gun. The secondary trigger attracts the targeted object to the gun and holds it in midair a few inches away, negating its weight and allowing the player to carry it with them. Using the secondary trigger again will drop the item, while the primary trigger will launch it with considerable force.

By combining these functions, players can use the gravity gun to scale barriers and obstacles, create cover against enemy characters, or launch the objects at enemy characters, causing them considerable damage. Certain types of objects, such as saw blades, fuel barrels and hydrogen tanks are intentionally designed by Valve to be used as "gravity gun ammunition". The gravity gun, however, cannot manipulate heavier objects and enemy characters until the late stages of the game, when the device becomes temporarily infused with dark energy meant to destroy it.

The gravity gun was very well received by critics, who considered it one of the defining features of Half-Life 2s entertainment value. Planet Half-Life called the gravity gun "the next level in interactive gaming." Electronic Gaming Monthly described Half-Life 2s gravity gun as the "thinking man's death tool," which lets players "toy with gravity to kill foes with everyday objects." Call of Duty series military adviser Hank Keirsey stated that "the weapon is not very practical".  He did, however, discuss its historical precedents, further stating that "The ancients learned very early how to use gravity to their advantage — but this usually involved rolling rocks down hills or pouring boiling oil down the castle walls. Those that failed to respect gravity suffered."

Influence on later games

Half-Life: Alyx 
Valve's 2020 virtual reality game Half-Life: Alyx is set as a prequel to Half-Life 2. The player controls Alyx Vance who during the events of the game gains a pair of "gravity gloves", which provide function similar to the gravity gun with the ability to lift and throw objects, though tailored to work as standard VR in-game hand controls.

TimeSplitters: Future Perfect Temporal Uplink 

It was not until the third installment of the  TimeSplitters franchise, TimeSplitters: Future Perfect, that the Temporal Uplink was given the ability to manipulate the physics in the game. In Future Perfect, the Temporal Uplink played a much larger role than that of its previous, map and mini-game oriented functionality, which the device was originally used for in TimeSplitters 2. Worn on the wrist of the main player character Sergeant Cortez, the uplink provides a map and the ability to pick up and throw objects, as well as the capability to activate switches remotely. Its grabbing abilities range from picking up weapons and ammo for use by the player in addition to launching objects from a distance at foes. This makes it an especially useful weapon for dispatching larger groups of enemies in the event that the player comes across one of the many explosive barrels placed throughout maps in the campaign mode of the game.

Doom 3 grabber 

Although Half-Life 2 and TimeSplitters: Future Perfect were the first games released to feature a gravity gun (the former released on November 16, 2004, and the latter released on March 21, 2005), id Software had previously conceived a similar idea during the development of the earlier title Doom 3. id Software designer Matt Hooper noted that "we actually used it as a tool throughout development where we'd grab physics objects and place them around the world". The tool was used to create "damaged" rooms in Doom 3; instead of constructing a ruined room, the designers would code a pristine room and use the device to "damage" it realistically. Although used to assist the development of Doom 3, the gravity gun was not implemented in the final game. Hooper explained that "we talked about that quite a few times, but we had such a big arsenal of weapons, and so many other cool things going on, that it was just one of those things that never made it in". However, Nerve Software revived the code for the weapon five months after the release of Half-Life 2 in Doom 3s expansion pack, Resurrection of Evil.

The device is noted in the Doom 3 storyline as an "ionized plasma levitator", created by the Union Aerospace Corporation for moving hazardous materials and a forerunner to tractor beams. Usually referred to as the "grabber", the player obtains the device early on in the course of Resurrection of Evil. The grabber operates differently from Half-Life 2s gravity gun, using only a single trigger function. Once the grabber is aimed at an appropriate object, it locks on, allowing the player to lift the object with the trigger. When the player releases the trigger, the object will be propelled forward with force, turning it into an impromptu weapon. One key ability of the grabber is its capacity to lock on to the fireball projectiles cast by some hostile non-player characters, allowing players to turn the attack against their foe. However, unlike the gravity gun in Half-Life 2, the grabber cannot hold objects for as long as the player wishes; if they wait too long to launch the object, the grabber will start to overload and disengage, dropping the object gently on the ground. Critics often compared the grabber directly with Half-Life 2s gravity gun, some noting that the device was far more combat-focused in operation than the gravity gun; in particular, the ability to turn projectiles cast by enemies against them was praised. However, the grabber was considered somewhat "awkward" to use, requiring a "finesse" that "is rarely something the player has time for in a close-quarters situation".

Others 
Various other video games have included gameplay features that allow players to use the game's physics to their advantage in combat. In some cases, these are manifested as weapons or devices. For instance, Portal (also created by Valve) features the Aperture Science Handheld Portal Device which displays a limited capacity to move objects around the game world, while Crytek's Crysis allows the player to throw objects and enemy characters considerable distances through the use of an experimental nanosuit.

In other games, however, it can be represented in a different manner:
In Arkane Studios' Dark Messiah of Might and Magic a psychokinesis spell allows for similar functions as Half-Life 2s gravity gun.
Destroy All Humans! portrayed a similar gravity usage, known as PK.
2K Games's BioShock displays the concept as a telekinesis plasmid.
In EA's third-person horror shooter Dead Space, the player character acquires a 'Kinesis' module, which allows the player to grab and throw objects.
in the Open Arena mod Powerball, there is a weapon called gravity mine launcher, a modified version of the grenade launcher that release gravity mines, that attract to them any too close player.
In Garry's Mod, one of the items is a gravity gun directly imported from Half-Life 2. It also includes a Physics Gun, a modified gravity gun which can position items and rag doll limbs as well as freeze them for constructing scenes or objects.
In Subnautica, there is a weapon called the Propulsion Cannon that the developers jokingly called the Gravity Gun, allowing people to drag things closer and throw them great distances.
In Space Station 13, crew members can research and then build the One-point Bluespace-Gravitational Manipulator, which has three modes, repulse, which throws everything in an area away, attract, which does the opposite, and chaos, which does both settings, randomly.
In Wild 9, the main character Wex Major can manipulate obstacles, objects and enemies through his main weapon called the "Rig", which is an electrical beam coming from Wex's back.
In the first person shooter VR game Boneworks and its sequel, Bonelab, the player character can manipulate and move any physics object with a gadget called the "Developer Manipulator."

Reception 
On IGN's list of top 100 weapons which originated in video games, the gravity gun was ranked #5. On GamesRadar's list of top 100 weapons in video games, the gravity gun was ranked #2 just behind the Cerebral Bore from Turok 2.

The Half-Life 2 gravity gun is one of several weapons used alongside ones from other game and film franchises in a climactic fight for the 2021 film Free Guy, which takes place within a video game.

See also 
Tractor beam

References 

Doom (franchise)
Half-Life (series)
TimeSplitters
Dead Space (franchise)
Video game objects
Fictional energy weapons